Mubarak Al-Saadi (Arabic:مبارك السعدي; born 28 February 1988) is a Qatari born-Omani footballer.

References

Qatari footballers
Omani footballers
1988 births
Living people
Al-Gharafa SC players
Al Kharaitiyat SC players
Lekhwiya SC players
Al Ahli SC (Doha) players
Al-Khor SC players
Al-Sailiya SC players
Al-Markhiya SC players
Naturalised citizens of Qatar
Association football fullbacks
Association football wingers